Alcohol sulfotransferase is an enzyme that catalyzes the sulfate conjugation of primary and secondary alcohols including many hormones, neurotransmitters, drugs, and xenobiotic compounds.

The chemical reaction is:

an alcohol + 3'-phosphoadenylyl-sulfate  adenosine 3',5'-bisphosphate + an organosulfate + H+

Family members 

Human genes that encode alcohol sulfotransferases include:
 SULT2A1
 SULT2B1
 SULT1C3

See also
 sulfotransferase

References

External links
 

EC 2.8.2